Events from the year 1487 in Ireland.

Incumbent
Lord: Henry VII

Events
May 24 – Lambert Simnel is crowned "King Edward VI" in Christ Church Cathedral, Dublin.

Births
Gerald FitzGerald, 9th Earl of Kildare (d. 1534)

Deaths
 Sigraid Ó Maolconaire, Irish Ruler.
 James FitzGerald, 8th Earl of Desmond, murdered.

References

 
1480s in Ireland
Ireland
Years of the 15th century in Ireland